is a 2014 Japanese animated/live-action science fantasy action film based on the Cardfight!! Vanguard series created by Bushiroad and Akira Itō. The film is co-produced by Liden Films and Ace Crew Entertainment, and was released in theaters in Japan on September 13, 2014.

Premise

Neon Messiah
The card game that gathered millions of players all over the world, and has become a part of everyday life. Through this game that has captivated the world, two card fighters, Aichi Sendou and Toshiki Kai, have met many friends and rivals, and grown. In the midst of his calm everyday life, from the bond he made with the unit "Blaster Blade", Aichi was entrusted with the wishes and prayers to save the Planet Cray from the brink of destruction, through a mysterious dream.

In that dream, Takuto Tatsunagi announced an invite-only tournament, and invited both Aichi and Kai to take part in "Messiah Scramble". The first prize is the card named "Messiah", the name of a savior that was heard in a dream. At the same time, there were many incidents of units disappearing from Vanguard cards throughout the world.

The destruction of Planet Cray, the disappearance of the units, and the person that stood before the invitees, Kouji Ibuki. And so, the curtain rises, on the harshest battle ever for the team of Aichi and Kai.

Three Games
A blackmail sent to the police containing a video showing the letters "VF" in flame. "VF" means to battle with the card game "Vanguard", in other words, to "fight". The criminal's demand is to call the strongest adult vanguard fighter, and to fight him against three games.

Cast

Neon Messiah
Tsubasa Yonaga as Aichi Sendō
Takuya Satō as Kai Toshiki
Izumi Kitta as Misaki Tokura
Shizuka Ishikawa as Kamui Katsuragi
Atsushi Abe as Ren Suzugamori
Toru Nara as Naoki Ishida
Mamoru Miyano as Kōji Ibuki

Three Games
Daigo as Daigo
Suzuko Mimori as Kōrrin Tatsuragī

Production
It was announced in August 2014 that Cardfight!! Vanguard anime series will receive a film adaptation, and will feature separate stories from both animated portion and live-action portion. The animated portion, titled Neon Messiah will be directed by, while the live-action portion is titled Three Games. Neon Messiah will be directed by Shin Itagaki, written by Mayori Sekijima and produced by Liden Films, while the Three Games will be directed by Takashi Motoki, written by Yutaka Bangadō and produced by Ace Crew Entertainment. Mamoru Miyano will voice a character in Neon Messiah segment, while Daigo will portray a middle school teacher named Daigo in Three Games.

Release
The film was released in Japanese theaters on September 13, 2014. It was released on DVD and Blu-Ray in Japan on May 2, 2015. An English sub was shown on July 4, 2015 at the Anime Expo in Los Angeles, California.

References

External links
  
 
 

2014 anime films
 
Bushiroad
Card games in anime and manga
Liden Films